Blue Ash is an American band, formed in Ohio in the summer of 1969 by bassist Frank Secich & vocalist Jim Kendzor. Guitarist Bill Yendrek and drummer David Evans were recruited later that summer.

The band debuted at "The Freak Out", a club in Youngstown, Ohio, on October 3, 1969. They gained a loyal following playing an endless stream of one-nighters over that year. In October 1970, Bill Yendrek, was replaced by guitarist/songwriter Bill "Cupid" Bartolin.

Blue Ash continued playing 250–300 dates a year throughout Pennsylvania, New York, Ohio and West Virginia, while the songwriting team Frank Secich and Bill Bartolin accumulated an enormous amount of original material. In June 1972, Blue Ash signed a production contract with Peppermint Productions of Youngstown and started recording and sending out demos. In late 1972, they were signed to Mercury Records by A&R man Paul Nelson. Their first album No More, No Less was released in May 1973 and received rave reviews in the rock press. It is considered a power pop classic, and is regarded as highly collectible among fans of that genre (it was finally released on CD on the Collectors' Choice label in September 2008). Blue Ash toured and opened for such acts as the Stooges, Bob Seger, Aerosmith, Ted Nugent and more but for lack of sales they were dropped by Mercury Records in May 1974.

Blue Ash continued to play live and record, adding drummer Jeff Rozniata who replaced David Evans in 1974. They were signed to a singles deal with Playboy Records in 1977. The first single, "Look At You Now" became a regional hit in Texas, Oklahoma, Louisiana and Mississippi, as well as in Ohio and Pennsylvania. Playboy then offered an album deal. The LP Front Page News was recorded in Los Angeles in August 1977 and released in October of that year. It was selling well, but in early 1978 Playboy International pulled the plug on Playboy Records and Blue Ash was once again without a label. They called it quits in 1979.

A few audience-recorded live tapes of the band exist (including one of the original lineup from January 31, 1974, at the Packard Music Hall in Warren, OH) but are of generally poor recording quality. Other tapes recorded by a fan who followed Blue Ash to many of their gigs are rumored to exist, but have yet to surface on the collectors circuit.

In the summer of 2003 original members Frank Secich, David Evans, Bill Bartolin and Jim Kendzor got together privately in Ohio to play once again and decided to reform the band. On November 8 they played the International Pop Overthrow at the Khyber Pass in Philadelphia.

In the late 1990s, renewed interest toward the band was given a boost as a large cache of unreleased Blue Ash recordings fell into circulation amongst collectors. In the summer of 2004 an official release of that material, a two CD retrospective called Around Again, was released on Not Lame Records. It contains 44 songs of unreleased material spanning their career.

For their "reunion" gigs from 2003–2009, Frank Secich moved from bass guitar to rhythm guitar, and former members Brian Wingrove (piano) and Jeff Rozniata (drums) completed the band along with Bobby Darke (bass).

On October 3, 2009, guitarist Bill "Cupid" Bartolin died from complications of cancer, thus bringing to a sad end the story of Blue Ash.

Frank Secich is now a member of Deadbeat Poets, who have released three critically acclaimed CDs: Notes From The Underground (2007), Circustown (2010) and Youngstown Vortex Sutra in 2011.

In the late 1990s, Jim Kendzor's nephew, guitarist Leonard Crist, and Bill "Cupid" Bartolin's son, drummer Sean Bartolin, formed Cork, a short-lived band based out of Youngstown while Crist played in the Youngstown indie rock bands Savage Pastry, Isabella the Brave, You Are The War That I Want and Abortopotamus Rex.

In 2016, original Blue Ash members Frank Secich and Jim Kendzor began performing as Blue Ash, backed by Secich's current band Deadbeat Poets. Sometimes jocularly referred to as Half Ash, this configuration toured Spain, a hotbed of power pop fandom, to great acclaim in June 2016. Secich, Kendzor and Deadbeat Poets member Pete Drivere have also performed several acoustic shows.

Discography

LPs & CDs
Blue Ash-No More, No Less-1973 Mercury LP SRM1-666
Blue Ash- Front Page News-1977 LP PZ 34918 U.S., Venezuela
Blue Ash-Around Again-2CD(A Collection Of Rarities From The Vault)2004 Not Lame NL 093
Blue Ash -The Alternate Around Again-2007-Powerpop Lovers
Blue Ash-No More, No Less-2008 Collectors' Choice CD
Blue Ash- Hearts & Arrows-2015 2 LP Set- You Are The Cosmos Spain
Blue Ash-15 Number Ones In A Perfect World-2016 CD- You Are The Cosmos Spain

Singles & EPs
Blue Ash-Abracadabra (Have You Seen Her?) b/w Dusty Old Fairgrounds 1973
Blue Ash-I Remember A Time b/w Plain To See 1973
Blue Ash-Anytime At All b/w She's So Nice 1974
Blue Ash-Look At You Now b/w Singing And Dancing Away 1977
Blue Ash-You Are All I Need b/w Jazel Jane 1977
Blue Ash-4 song 7-inch EP-You Are The Cosmos 2014 Spain
Blue Ash-Abracadabra (Have You Seen Her?) b/w Hippy, Hippy Shake-Get Hip Records Archive Series 7-inch vinyl 2016

See also
Music of Ohio

References

 All Music Guide
 All Music Guide
 Robert Christgau
 Artist Direct

External links
notlame.com
Blue Ash Blog

American power pop groups
Mercury Records artists
Playboy Records artists
Musical groups from Ohio
Musical groups established in 1969